Prétot-Vicquemare is a commune in the Seine-Maritime department, Normandy, northern France.

Geography

Population

Places of interest
 The church of St.Pierre, dating from the twelfth century.
 The chapel of Notre-Dame, dating from the seventeenth century.
 The Mottes de Vicquemare.
 Parts of the thirteenth century manorhouse, now a farm.

People
 Andre Raimbourg, French singer and actor, was born here in 1917.

See also
Communes of the Seine-Maritime department

References

Communes of Seine-Maritime